Calvin Theological Journal is an academic journal published by Calvin Theological Seminary.

References 

Protestant studies journals
Publications established in 1966
English-language journals
Biannual journals